The Grand Contour Canal in England and Wales was intended to enhance and upgrade the British canal system, but was never built. This canal was proposed in 1943, and again ten years later, by J F Pownall.  Pownall observed that there was a natural 'contour' down the spine of England, around the 300 ft level that connected several of the most populated areas. He put forward the idea that this contour could be used to define the course of a large European sized canal which contained no locks except at its entry and exit points. It would also serve  as a water grid capable of distributing domestic water supply around England as need arises.

The proposal would have accommodated 300-ton continental-size barges. Feeder conduit canals at the same contour level would have been used to bring water into the system from North Wales, The Pennines and the South West Peninsula.

It was also named The Three-hundred-foot Canal for its height above sea level, .

The scheme was intended both for transport and for a water supply grid, for water distribution is a major problem in London and South East England.

In 2012 the scheme was brought back to attention after Boris Johnson, the Mayor of London, showed his support for the scheme as a way to transport water from the higher, and wetter, areas of Wales, Scotland, and northern England to the 'breadbasket' of the south east. A maximum flow of water of some  anywhere in either direction was visualised, sourced from the Northern Pennines , the Dee, the Severn and the Wye  and Exmoor .

Earlier schemes
The Elan Valley Reservoirs scheme (1892) in mid-Wales (capacity 99,000 megalitres) which includes (with four others) the Craig Goch Dam provides water to Birmingham (pop. 1 million), but was designed looking forward 63 years.

Lake Vyrnwy was created by the construction of the first large masonry dam in Britain, between 1881 and 1888, to provide an urgently needed new water supply for the growing city of Liverpool, and the water from the Welsh mountains was to be carried by an aqueduct to the city.

By 1875 it was obvious that growing population of the city would need even more water, so plans were drawn up to construct a reservoir in the Lake District.

See also
Canals of Great Britain
List of canals of the United Kingdom - list also covers abandoned and proposed canals

Further reading
 "Engineering", Vol 153 (1942) p. 263
 "Engineering", Vol 156 (1943) p. 281
 "Engineering", 11 Dec. 1953, p. 741
 "Water and Sanitary Engineer" 
 "Dock and Harbour" journal
 Bateman, John, History and Description of the Manchester Waterworks, 1884 (628.1)
 Harwood, J. J., History and Description of the Thirlmere Water Scheme, 1895 (628 1 H1)
 Quayle, Tom, Reservoirs in the Hills, 1988 (q628.132QU)
 Thirlmere Defence Association, Manchester and Thirlmere Water Scheme, 1877 (628.1)
 The Manchester Corporation Waterworks Undertaking – A Short History and Description,1930 (628 1 Ma(660)
 M126 Manchester and Salford Sanitary Association, 1848–1924
 M231 Manchester and Salford Waterworks Co.,1836–1841, Manchester Corporation Waterworks, 1848–1966
 "The Grand Contour Pt.1" by Michael Baldwin, Waterways World, Sept 1975, p. 23 
 "The Grand Contour Pt.2" by Michael Baldwin, Waterways World, Oct 1975, p. 22

References

External links
 Museum of Science & Industry: ‘Underground Manchester’ Gallery

Canals in England
Water supply and sanitation in England
Proposed transport infrastructure in England
Proposed canals
Proposed transport infrastructure in Wales
Cancelled projects in Wales